Robert Cooley may refer to:
Robert Cooley (lawyer) (born 1943), US author, former Mafia lawyer and government informant
Robert Cooley (entomologist) (1873–1968), US entomologist
Robert E. Cooley, president emeritus of Gordon-Conwell Theological Seminary